Eugene Chris Martínez (born 20 October 1997), also known as Pele Martínez,  is a Belizean professional footballer who plays as a defender for Vancouver FC of the Canadian Premier League and the Belize national football team.

College career
In 2018, he began attending Cerritos College where he played for the men's soccer team. He scored his first collegiate goal on 27 August 2019 against the Fullerton Hornets. In 2018, he was named to the All-South Coast Conference Second Team. In 2018, he was named to the All-South Coast Conference First Team.

In 2021, he began attending California State Polytechnic University, Pomona, where he played for the men's soccer team. He scored his first goal on 2 September 2021 against the Point Loma Sea Lions. In 2022, he earned All-CCAA honorable mention honours.

Club career
He spent the early part of his career in the Premier League of Belize, playing with Wagiya SC (2015-2016), Belmopan Bandits (2016-17), Dangria Youth Futbol Academy (2017), and Belize Defence Force FC (2017-18).

In 2018, he played with L.A. Wolves FC in the United Premier Soccer League. In 2022, he began playing with Flash FC in the United Premier Soccer League, and in 2023 he helped them reach the semi-finals of the UPSL SoCal Regional Cup, scoring four goals.

In February 2023, he signed with Vancouver FC of the Canadian Premier League, after participating in the club's open trials.

International career
In 2022, he represented Belize in the 2022–23 CONCACAF Nations League B. He was again called up to the squad in March 2023.

Personal
Martinez founded the Pele Soccer Foundation in his native Belize, which teaches youth the fundamentals of football, collects new clothes and equipment for the children, and instills the importance of pursuing an education.

References

External links

Living people
1997 births
Belizean footballers
Belize international footballers
Cerritos Falcons men's soccer players
Cal Poly Pomona Broncos athletes
Vancouver FC players
Association football defenders
Premier League of Belize players
Belize Defence Force FC players
Wagiya FC players
Belmopan Bandits players
United Premier Soccer League players